Bharat Ganeshpure (born August 15, 1969) is an Indian actor and comedian. He is best known for his comical performances in the Marathi television shows Fu Bai Fu and Chala Hawa Yeu Dya (CHYD). Bharat Ganeshpure rose to fame with his performance in Chala Hawa Yeu Dya. The typical Vidarbha Marathi Accent, also known as Varhadi, is the specialty of Bharat. Bharat has also acted supporting roles in several Marathi films, the most recent being Chi Va Chi Sau Ka. Bharat was also played a pivotal role in Marathi comedy film Jalsa.

Television 
 Tharar
 Abhalmaya
 Baa Bahoo Aur Baby
 CID
 Fu Bai Fu
 Shejari Shejari Pakke Shejari
 Chala Hawa Yeu Dya - major roles played by him
 Mrs. Tendulkar
 Crime Patrol as Vijay Jadhav (10th August 2012)
 Vadalvaat

Movies 

Though Bharat has always acted more supporting roles in the movie, but his roles in the movies Ek Daav Dhobi Pachhad, Nishani Dava Angatha, and Kapus Kondyachi Goshta are well-praised by the audience. In Kapus Kondyachi Goshta, he performed the role of villain, which is exactly opposite to his image of being a comedian. In the movie Jalsa, he was seen in a pivotal role.  

Marathi 

Hindi

References

External links

1969 births
Living people
Indian male film actors
Indian male television actors
Indian male comedians
Male actors in Marathi television